WTF! is a 2017 American horror film directed by Peter Herro. It was written by Herro, Christopher Lawrence Centanni and Adam Buchalter. It stars Callie Ott, Nicholas James Reilly, Andrea Hunt, and Johnny James Fiore, with a special appearance by Perez Hilton. The film follows a group of college friends onto their vacation at a secluded cabin. One by one, a killer works their way through the group, a killer who has links to an earlier massacre one of them previously survived.

Plot 
Years after narrowly escaping a mass slaughter that left her traumatized, Rachel reluctantly attends a Spring Break retreat with her friends. Her brother in tow, her borderline abusive boyfriend flirting with her girlfriends, and hangers-on along for the ride, the entire group decide to spend Spring Break in an isolated cabin in the woods. Hormones, secrets, and skinny-dipping abound, but there's a lingering danger around the edges of their adventure, creepy noises and strange happenings, including a nail through the foot of one of the girls.

When one of their group goes missing, only to turn up dead with his throat slit, trouble shifts to the forefront. A hooded figure stalks the group, one that is knocking each member off in a particularly nasty way from a stabbing to hairspray flames to the face. With bodies mounting and tempers flaring, Rachel realizes that what happened to her before is happening again. She's about to face off once again with the monster that killed her last group of friends. Unlike the last time, the only way out is to face down her tormentor and the twist to the murders that makes the deaths even more horrible than first revealed.

Cast 

 Callie Ott as Rachel
 Nicholas James Reilly as Toby
 Andrea Hunt as Bonnie
 Benjamin Norris as Jacob
 Sarah Agor as Lisa
 Johnny James Fiore as Sam
 Adam Foster as Bevan
 Perez Hilton as Donnie
 Shawn C Phillips as Bert
 Chloe Berman as Jessie
 Cheyann Dillan as Carla
 Nicolle Blair as WTF girl
 Adam Blake as Professor Pendleton
 Anna Sambrooks as Aunt Tracy

Production 
WTF! marked Peter Herro's feature film directorial debut after producing several short films. Pre-production lasted two years before a filming shoot of 12 days with 12-14 hour daily workloads. Produced by Cthulhu Crush Productions, it was filmed in the Los Angeles area.

Release
On August 1, 2017 WTF! was released by Midnight Releasing on video-on-demand platforms such as Google Play, iTunes, Amazon Instant, Xbox, Vimeo, Steam, and Vudo, as well as a dvd release.

Reception
In his review for Starburst magazine, John Townsend gave WTF! five stars from ten. He praised the originality in aspects of the script and its last act but felt it lacked sufficient depth, concluding: "... This is not a film to live long in the memory." Reviewing for Dread Central, Matt Boiselle gave one and a half stars from five, criticizing stereotypical characters, the premise, and a lack of creativity. Chris Coffel of Bloody Disgusting criticized the film's story as routine with formulaic characterisations, but he praised the performances and the depiction of the murders with good use of "practical effects". He concluded: " ... This wont go down as a classic and may not be something you re-visit very often but its enjoyable and worth a late night watch."

References

External links

2017 horror films
American slasher films
2017 films
2010s English-language films
2010s American films